T M Opera O (March 13, 1996 – May 2018) was a champion Japanese thoroughbred racehorse, and was the world's all-time leading money earner at the time of his retirement in 2001. In 1999, he was the champion three-year-old colt in Japan after winning the Satsuki Sho (Japanese 2000 Guineas). At age four, he was the Japanese Horse of the Year and champion older horse after an undefeated season that included wins in the Tenno Sho (both spring and autumn) and Japan Cup. T M Opera O was inducted into the Japan Racing Association Hall of Fame in 2004.

Background
T M Opera O was a chestnut horse who was bred in Japan by Kineusu Bokujo. He was sired by Opera House, an outstanding British middle-distance runner who was exported to stud in Japan. T M Opera O was out of the American-bred mare Once Wed, an unraced daughter of Blushing Groom.

T M Opera O was sold as a yearling in the 1997 Hokkaido October Sale for 10,500,000(JPY) to Masatsugu Takezono. He was trained by Ichizo Iwamoto and regularly ridden by Ryuji Wada.

Racing career 

T M Opera O finished second in his only start at age two, after which he injured his left hind leg and was unable to race again for several months.

At age three, he made ten starts, amassing a record of four wins, two seconds and three thirds. Early in the year he broke his maiden, then won the Yukiyanagi Sho at Hanshin over a distance of 2000m for his first stakes win. He followed this up by winning the Grade III Mainichi Hai on March 28, 1999. Despite his three race winning streak, he was largely dismissed at odds of 11–1 in the Grade I Satsuki Sho (Japanese 2000 Guineas) on April 18. He raced near the back of the field during the early running then circled wide in deep stretch and prevailed by a neck in the final strides.

Later that year, he finished second in the Kikuka Sho (Japanese St Leger) and third in both the Tokyo Yushun (Japanese Derby) and Arima Kinen. He received the JRA Award for Best Three-Year-Old Colt.

2000: Four-year old season
As a four-year-old in 2000, T M Opera O was undefeated in 8 starts, including four domestic Grade I wins and one international Grade I win.

He started the season on March 19 with a win in the Hanshin Daishoten at a distance of 3000m. He then won the Tenno Sho (spring) at a distance of 3200m (roughly 2 miles) before shortening up to a distance of 2200m to win the Takarazuka Kinen.

After a brief layoff, T M Opera won the Kyoto Daishoten on October 8. On October 29, he started in the 2000m Tenno Sho (autumn) from the outside post position 13. Jockey Ryuji Wada rode him strongly from the gate and moved aggressively towards the rail to save ground around the first turn. T M Opera O settled in third place then swung wide as they turned into the final stretch. He battled with Meisho Doto before hitting the lead with 200m remaining, then drew away to win by  lengths. He became just the third horse to win both the spring and autumn versions of the Tenno Sho in the same year. "He has no faults", said Wada. "And mentally he's so tough I wish he’d share some of it with me."

T M Opera O earned the seventh straight win of his four-year old campaign in the Japan Cup. He was made the heavy favorite by a crowd of 110,000 in a field that included eight horses from Japan and seven foreign entries. Stay Gold went to the early lead and set a slow pace, while T M Opera O settled into sixth place. T M Opera O started his move on the final turn and took the lead with 200m remaining. Under heavy urging, he withstood a late charge by Meisho Doto to win by a neck, with Fantastic Light a further nose behind in third. The win moved T M Opera O past Cigar as the leading money earner of all-time with winnings of 1.26 billion yen or $11.6 million.

On December 24, T M Opera O made his final start of the year in the Arima Kinen at Nakayama Racecourse. He raced near the back of the field down the backstretch, then slowly made up ground on the final turn. Entering the final stretch, he was still well behind and faced a wall of horses in front of him. Wada decided to wait for an opening rather than lose ground by attempting to swing wide. With just 200m remaining, he finally found a narrow gap and urged T M Opera to squeeze through. The horse responded with a burst and closed rapidly to prevail over Meisho Doto by a nose. "I'm relieved", said Wada. "It was a tough race. I couldn't get the position I wanted at the start and I thought I'd blown it."

T M Opera O was the unanimous selection as the Japanese Horse of the Year and Best Older Horse.

2001: Five-year-old season

In 2001, T M Opera O won two of seven starts with three second-place finishes. The highlight of this year was a repeat win in the Tenno Sho (spring), in which he defeated Meisho Doto by a nose.

On June 25, T M Opera O attempted to repeat in the Takarazuka Kinen but was upset by Meisho Doto. T M Opera O had experienced severe traffic problems before swinging wide and mounting a "spectacular" closing drive that fell short by  lengths. It was Meisho Doto's first win against T M Opera O in six attempts, all in Grade 1 events.

After a brief layoff, T M Opera O returned on October 1 to win the Kyoto Daishoten. On October 28, he finished second in the Tenno Sho (autumn) to Agnes Digital, with Meisho Doto in third. In his next start on November 25, he finished second in the Japan Cup, just a neck short of Japanese Derby winner Jungle Pocket. He made his final start in the Arima Kinen, finishing fifth.

T M Opera O retired at the end of 2001 as the world's all-time leading money-earner. He won 1,835,189,000yen (US$16,200,337) during his career.

Racing summary

* At the time, most Japanese races were restricted to domestic-bred horses and the internal grading was not internationally recognized. The Japan Cup and 2001 Takarazuka Kinen however were open to foreign bred horses.

Source: JBIS Race Records

Stud career
T M Opera O was retired to stud in 2002, during which he covered 98 mares. He was not considered a success and interest in him steadily declined. His most successful offspring on the flat was T M Yokado, winner of the Queen Sho. T M Toppazure became his leading money earner after a successful second career as a jumper. T M Opera O died suddenly after suffering a heart attack at the Hakuba Bokujo Farm, Hokkaido, in May 2018.

Pedigree 

In the pedigree, symbols before a horse's name mean the horse was foaled in one country but subsequently stood at stud in another

See also
List of leading Thoroughbred racehorses
List of historical horses

References 

 T M Opera O's pedigree and racing stats

1996 racehorse births
2018 racehorse deaths
Racehorses bred in Japan
Racehorses trained in Japan
Japan Cup winners
Japanese Thoroughbred Horse of the Year
Thoroughbred family 4-m